Travis Joel Gary Johnson (born 28 August 2000) is an English professional footballer who plays as a right-back for  club Crawley Town. He previously played for Crewe Alexandra.

Career

Crewe Alexandra
Johnson joined Crewe Alexandra's Academy and signed his first professional contract in the summer of 2018, agreeing a new contract in June 2019. He made his first Crewe start and first-team debut in an EFL Trophy group stage game at Mansfield Town on 8 October 2019, and his league debut on 11 January 2020, coming on as a 68th minute substitute for Nicky Hunt, at Swindon Town. On 13 March 2020, Johnson joined Witton Albion until 25 April 2020.

He was offered a new contract in June 2020, and signed a new one-year deal. On 13 May 2021, Crewe announced that it had triggered a contract extension. In November 2021, Johnson suffered an ankle ligament injury during training, ruling him out of first-team action for some weeks. Johnson was initially offered a new contract at the end of the 2021–22 season following Crewe's relegation, however this offer was later withdrawn, allowing Johnson to leave the club on a free transfer.

Crawley Town
On 20 June 2022, it was announced that Johnson would join EFL League Two club Crawley Town on a two-year contract on 1 July 2022, following the expiration of his contract at Crewe.

Career statistics

References

2000 births
Living people
English footballers
Footballers from Stoke-on-Trent
Association football defenders
English Football League players
Crewe Alexandra F.C. players
Crawley Town F.C. players
Witton Albion F.C. players